United Nations Security Council resolution 469, adopted on 20 May 1980, after considering a report by the Secretary-General and noting relevant parts of the Geneva Convention, the Council deplored the Government of Israel's failure to implement Resolution 468 (1980).

The Council went on to call on Israel to rescind the expulsion of the Mayors of Hebron and Halhoul and the Sharia judge of Hebron, and requests the Secretary-General to continue his efforts.

The resolution was adopted with 14 votes to none, and one abstention from the United States.

See also
 Israeli–Palestinian conflict
 List of United Nations Security Council Resolutions 401 to 500 (1976–1982)

References
Text of the Resolution at undocs.org

External links
 

 0469
 0469
Israeli–Palestinian conflict and the United Nations
1980 in Israel
May 1980 events